Rosemary Anne Ganley (born 1937) is a Canadian educator, journalist, and activist.

Ganley was a high school teacher by profession prior to her retirement. In the late 1970s, she and her husband John founded the Jamaican Self-Help organization in Peterborough, Ontario, to provide aid in Jamaican communities in Canada. In 1995 she was chosen as the representative for Canadian women at the Fourth United Nations Conference on Women in Beijing; she appeared at the Beijing Plus Five Review at the same time. During her career she has led workshops on various topics such as women's issues and justice across cultural boundaries. Among the awards she has received was the 150th Anniversary Medal from the Government of Canada, given to her in 1992. More recently, she has served on the G7's council on issues of gender equality worldwide. Her book Jamaica Journal: The Story Of A Grassroots Canadian Aid Organization was published in 2018.

References

1937 births
Living people
Canadian feminists
Canadian schoolteachers
People from Peterborough, Ontario